Théodore Paraskivesco (born 11 July 1940 in Bucharest) is a naturalized French pianist of Romanian origin.

Biography 
Paraskivesco entered the Bucharest Conservatory and studied with Silvia Șerbescu. He graduated with five first prizes. In 1961, he was awarded the Georges Enesco International Competition prize. He then received a scholarship from the French government and continued his musical studies in Paris with Magda Tagliaferro, Yvonne Lefébure and Nadia Boulanger. In 1970, he won the Prix Claude Debussy, composer of which he is one of the most respected performers.

He recently taught piano and chamber music at the Conservatoire de Paris (1985) and gives several master classes, notably in Greece and Japan. In 1995, he was also appointed professor of piano at the Conservatoire européen de Paris.

He plays in trio with Jean Estournet and Michel Strauss and accompanies singers for melodies.

Discography 
Most of the pianist's remaining recordings are published under the Calliope label:

 Claude Debussy: Complete work for piano (1980).
 Beethoven: Sonatas for piano: Op. 31 nº 2 Tempest, Op. 57 Appassionata.
 Gabriel Fauré: Mélodies (Automne, Clair de lune, Les berceaux, et al.) with Jacques Herbillon
 Maurice Ravel: Don Quichotte à Dulcinée, Chansons madécasses and other melodies with Jacques Herbillon.
 Robert Schumann: Liederkreis Op. 39 with Audrey Michael.

Bibliography

References

External links 
 Discography on Discogs
 Théodore Paraskivesco plays Debussy's Suite Bergamasque (1976) (YouTube)

1940 births
Living people
Musicians from Bucharest
Romanian classical pianists
20th-century French male classical pianists
21st-century French male classical pianists
Classical accompanists
Academic staff of the Conservatoire de Paris
Romanian emigrants to France